Monarch Beach is a small neighborhood in Orange County, California located within the city of Dana Point. It is primarily a residential community. Two luxury resorts, Waldorf Astoria Monarch Beach Resort & Club and the Ritz-Carlton Laguna Niguel, are located within the area. Monarch Beach is close to the city boundary between Dana Point and Laguna Niguel.

History
Monarch Beach is named after its most prominent geological feature, Monarch Bay, aptly named as its rolling hills of sagebrush and manzanita were once a breeding ground for the monarch butterfly.  The butterflies were once seen there in large masses, but have disappeared from the area because their habitat has been replaced, almost entirely, by the large houses that can be found in the Monarch Beach neighborhood.

Monarch Beach became a subdivision of the incorporated city of Dana Point on January 1, 1989.

Culture
Monarch Beach has access to Salt Creek Beach and a picnic area. The neighborhood includes the Monarch Beach Resort & Links Course – an 18-hole golf course designed by Robert Trent Jones Jr. It is also the home to the Dana Point Concours d'Elegance automotive charitable event held each year on the Monarch Beach Golf Links.

Notable people
 Marcus Allen
 Fred Roggin 
 Nicole Brown Simpson
 O.J. Simpson

References 

Dana Point, California
Neighborhoods in Orange County, California
Gated communities in California